Debra A. Murphy is a Professor Emerita at the University of California, Los Angeles in the Department of Psychiatry.

Education 
Murphy received her B.A in Psychiatry and M.S. in Clinical Psychology from the San Diego State University of California. She enrolled in the Florida State University of Tallahassee in Florida and in 1987 she attained her Ph.D. in Clinical Psychology.

Research and career 
Murphy has conducted Human Immunodeficiency Virus/Acquired immunodeficiency syndrome behavioral research on people of all ages over the past 30 years and her main area of research are: (1) children and adolescents affected by maternal HIV/AIDS; (2) mental health among HIV-positive adolescents and high-risk adolescents, and medication adherence among infected adolescents; and (3) assessment of children and adolescents.

Notable Studies

Murphy conducted the first longitudinal follow-up study of children affected by maternal HIV/AIDS. In 1997 she began the 5-year “Parents And children Coping Together” study (PACT; community title), funded  by the National Institute of Mental Health. PACT was the first prospective study examining the impact of maternal HIV/AIDS on children and on the mother-child relationship.

A competing renewal was submitted to continue to follow the families as the children transitioned to early/middle adolescence. That 5-year R01, “Parents and Adolescents Coping Together"  (PACT II) was funded in 2002. Another renewal was submitted entitled PACT III, to follow the families one last time, as the early/middle adolescents transitioned to late adolescence/early adulthood (funded in 2008 and completed in 2013).  Overall, it was a 16-year study (three R01s and 1 year of bridge funding).

PACT was the first prospective study examining the impact of maternal HIV/AIDS on children and on the mother-child relationship.  Most importantly, it was the first cohort of children affected by maternal HIV/AIDS followed all the way from early school age through late adolescence/early adulthood, and thus the only group of children in the United States to be followed continuously as they grew up to adulthood while living with a mother with HIV/AIDS. Findings from the PACT study were used to develop several funded intervention trials.  Three of these interventions are of note.

The first intervention study, funded in January 2007 by NIMH (R01MH077493), was to develop and conduct a 3-year pilot study of a disclosure intervention for HIV-positive mothers with young children (community title: Teaching, Raising, And Communicating with Kids; the TRACK study).  Murphy developed the TRACK intervention and conducted a randomized controlled trial of the intervention. The pilot results indicated that those in the intervention group were six times more likely to disclose their HIV/AIDS status to their child than those in the control group (O.R. 6.33).  Perhaps more importantly, the mother intervention group’s emotional functioning and their satisfaction improved significantly following intervention. Similarly, child mental health indicators among the children of intervention mothers were significantly better than control group children. The way mothers were taught to disclose appears to have prevented the disclosure from being traumatic for both mothers and children.

The second intervention study that stemmed from Murphy’s longitudinal PACT observational study was funded by NIMH in 2010 (R01MH086329), entitled “A Parenting Intervention for HIV+ Moms: The IMAGE Program.” IMAGE stood for Improving Mothers’ parenting Abilities, Growth, and Effectiveness. The study was designed to develop and pilot test a self-care and parenting intervention for HIV-positive mothers with young children. Murphy wrote the IMAGE intervention and conducted a randomized controlled trial of it; results showed significant effects of the intervention for improving parenting practices for mothers in the intervention condition. The intervention also improved family outcomes and improvements in the parent-child relationship. Thus, IMAGE had a positive impact on parenting behaviors, and on maternal, child, and family outcomes. IMAGE has since been successfully translated and used in Iran.  

Finally, the third intervention was a follow-up to the TRACK pilot study, given the efficacy of the pilot trial in terms of improving the number disclosures among mothers living with HIV/AIDS to their young children.  A full-scale, two-city trial of TRACK was funded, with Murphy as the Principal Investigator at the Southern California site (centered at UCLA), and was conducted in two distinct geographical areas of the country with diverse ethnic/racial populations (NIMH R01MH09418 & R01MH09423). TRACK intervention mothers were six times more likely to disclose their HIV serostatus than controls. Intervention mothers showed improvements in communication, social support, family routines, and most significantly, disclosure self-efficacy. Intervention mothers also demonstrated decreased anxiety and better mental health scores; their children reported significantly more decline in worry than controls. This full-scale trial, over and above the pilot, showed the intervention improved outcomes across multiple sites, and found all targeted intermediate variables improved in the intervention group relative to the control group (i.e., disclosure self-efficacy, family routines, parenting practices, and parent-child communication).

Awards and honors 
In 1996, she was awarded with C. Everett Koop National Health Award for an HIV Prevention Program for High-Risk, Inner-City Women. She has been a member of various professional societies including the American Psychological Association (APA), International AIDS Society, and International Society for Research in Child & Adolescent Psychopathology.

References

External links
 Scopus - Murphy A Debra

List
San Diego people
UCSD people
Florida State University alumni
Living people
Year of birth missing (living people)